Samuel Heywood may refer to:

Samuel Heywood (chief justice) (1753–1828), Chief Justice of Wales
Samuel Heywood (Berkeley) (1833–1903), early resident and President of the Town Board of Trustees (mayor) of Berkeley, California
Samuel R. Heywood (1821–1913), American businessman